Terror Squad may refer to:

 Informal name for an anti-terrorism security body
 Terror Squad (group), a hip-hop group started by Fat Joe
 Terror Squad: The Album, the group's debut album
 Terror Squad (Artillery album)
 Terror Squad (film), a 1987 film directed by Peter Maris
 Terror Squad Productions, a hip hop and R&B record label founded by Fat Joe
 "Terror Squad", a song by Zomboy
 Terror Squad, a Canadian aboriginal gang